TEP80 (ТЭП80) is a Soviet diesel locomotive produced in 1988–1989. Only two locomotives of this model were built.

History and design
The principal designer was V. Khlebnikov; the locomotive utilised an 8-axle articulated design within a single locomotive body, two sets of main bogies each of four axles articulated in a Bo-Bo arrangement.

It is claimed that Unit TEP80-0002 holds the world speed record for a diesel railed vehicle having reached  on 5 October 1993. This record has not been verified by any independent witness. In 2007, the machine was transferred from the Russian Railway research institute (VNIIZhT) to the October railway museum (Музей Октябрьской железной дороги) in Saint Petersburg.

See also
 History of rail transport in Russia

References

Railway locomotives introduced in 1988
Diesel locomotives of Russia
Diesel locomotives of the Soviet Union
5 ft gauge locomotives
High-speed trains of Russia